LPEC can stand for:

Linear Predictive Echo Cancelling
Linn Protocol for Eventing and Control
Long-term Predicted Excitation Coding, a Sony codec optimised for voice recording
LCV Platform Engineering Corporation, a joint venture between Isuzu and General Motors
Lost Planet: Extreme Condition, a third-person shooter video game
LP Executive Consulting, LLC, a US-based loss prevention and security consulting company